Solute carrier family 41, member 3 is a protein that in humans is encoded by the SLC41A3 gene.

Model organisms 

Model organisms have been used in the study of SLC41A3 function. A conditional knockout mouse line, called Slc41a3tm1a(KOMP)Wtsi was generated as part of the International Knockout Mouse Consortium program — a high-throughput mutagenesis project to generate and distribute animal models of disease to interested scientists.

Male and female animals underwent a standardized phenotypic screen to determine the effects of deletion. Twenty six tests were carried out on mutant mice and one significant abnormality was observed: homozygous mutants displayed abnormal locomotor coordination.

References

Further reading 
 
 

Genes mutated in mice
Solute carrier family